J. Gabriel Gates is an American author, screenwriter, and actor. Gates grew up in Michigan and attended Florida State University, where he graduated with a degree in theater. He began writing with fellow author Charlene Keel after putting out an ad on Craigslist for a mentor. The two co-created the young adult series The Tracks with the intent of turning it into a television series, later re-planning it as a series of novels.

Bibliography
The Sleepwalkers (2011) 
Blood Zero Sky (2012)

The Tracks
Dark Territory (2011) 
Ghost Crown (2011)

References

Living people
Year of birth missing (living people)
American male screenwriters
Screenwriters from Michigan